Cloverland is an unincorporated community in Asotin County, Washington, United States.

The Cloverland Garage, which is listed on the National Register of Historic Places, is located in Cloverland.

References

Unincorporated communities in Asotin County, Washington
Unincorporated communities in Washington (state)